Glitter Pals was an American two-piece band formed in 2004 by then-Vassar College students Mookie Singerman and Jake Friedman, their name taking inspiration from the glitter that would remain on their sweat-drenched bodies after their intense lovemaking sessions in their 'glitter box'. Singerman is the vocalist for Philadelphia cybergrind band Genghis Tron. The two members are also the owners/founders of the independent record label Lovepump United, which released their debut EP, Unleash the Compassion in July 2005. The EP was recorded by New York City producer Martin Bisi.

Discography
Unleash The Compassion CDEP (Lovepump United, 2006)

References

Musical groups from New York (state)
Musical groups established in 2004